Seredka is a rural locality (a village) in Megrinskoye Rural Settlement, Chagodoshchensky District, Vologda Oblast, Russia. The population was 19 as of 2002.

Geography 
Seredka is located km northeast of Chagoda (the district's administrative centre) by road. Lvov Dvor is the nearest rural locality.

References 

Rural localities in Chagodoshchensky District